Maiju Ruotsalainen (born 25 November 1983) is a Finnish footballer and coach who played for the Finland women's national football team. At club level she most recently represented Åland United of the Naistenliiga. She formerly played for FC Honka and Italy's Torres CF, and she has also played in the UEFA Women's Champions League with all three teams.

Club career
Ruotsalainen began playing in her native Tampere with Ilves, then spent time in Helsinki with MPS and HJK. She spent four seasons with FC Honka, of Espoo, intersected by a spell in Denmark with Vejle.

Ahead of the 2013 season, Ruotsalainen travelled to England for a trial with English FA WSL giants Doncaster Rovers Belles. Although the Belles wanted to sign her, she ultimately decided to rejoin Åland United. Heel and hip injuries caused Ruotsalainen to miss most of the 2013 season.

In October 2013 Ruotsalainen left Åland United after five years and returned to her first club Ilves, where she took up a youth coaching role.

International career
Ruotsalainen was named in the Finland squad for the 2012 Cyprus Cup. At the tournament she featured as a late substitute in Finland's opening match, a 3–1 defeat by England at GSP Stadium.

References

External links
 

1983 births
Living people
Finnish women's footballers
Finland women's international footballers
Åland United players
Helsingin Jalkapalloklubi (women) players
Kansallinen Liiga players
Finnish expatriate footballers
Expatriate women's footballers in Italy
Expatriate men's footballers in Denmark
FC Honka (women) players
Serie A (women's football) players
Torres Calcio Femminile players
Women's association football midfielders
Women's association football forwards
Sportspeople from Tampere